Tamananthus is a genus of Venezuelan plants in the tribe Millerieae  within the family Asteraceae.

Species
The only known species is Tamananthus crinitus, native to Táchira State in the Andes of western Venezuela.

References

Monotypic Asteraceae genera
Endemic flora of Venezuela
Millerieae